Izatha spheniscella is a species of moth in the family Oecophoridae. It is endemic to New Zealand. This species is classified as "At Risk, Naturally Uncommon" by the Department of Conservation. It is only found on the subantarctic Snares Islands.

Taxonomy and etymology 
This species was first described by Robert J. B. Hoare in 2010. The species epithet is a female diminutive of Spheniscus, a penguin, and refers to the female moth's brachyptery and to the rocky subantarctic island habitat. The holotype specimen is held at the New Zealand Arthropod Collection.

Description 
The wingspan of the adult moth is 14–15 mm for males and about 14 mm for females. The only species that I. spheniscella may be confused with is I. oleariae as this is the only related species that also inhabits the Snares Islands. However the two species are easily distinguished as the male I. spheniscella is shorter winged and is darker in appearance. The female I. spheniscella is even more distinct as it is brachypterous where as the female I. oleariae is full winged.

Distribution 
This species is endemic to New Zealand. It is only found on the Snares Islands.

Biology and behaviour 
Little is known of the biology of this species. Pupae have been found amongst green algae, the presumed larval host plant, on an overhanging granite rock on Rima Islet, part of the Western Chain of the Snares. The male paratype from Alert Stack was found amongst crustose lichens, suggesting these may also be fed on by larvae. The larvae of this species is unknown. Adults have been recorded on the wing in December and February.

Conservation Status
This species has been classified as having the "At Risk, Naturally Uncommon" conservation status under the New Zealand Threat Classification System.

References

Oecophorinae
Moths described in 2010
Moths of New Zealand
Endemic fauna of New Zealand
Endangered biota of New Zealand
Endemic moths of New Zealand